Mark Anthony Scheib (born 4 September 1967 in Stratford) is a New Zealand sprint canoeist who competed in the early 1990s. He was eliminated in the semifinals of the K-4 1000 m event at the 1992 Summer Olympics in Barcelona.

References

External links
 
 

1967 births
Canoeists at the 1992 Summer Olympics
Living people
New Zealand male canoeists
Olympic canoeists of New Zealand
Sportspeople from Stratford, New Zealand